Magoe National Park is a protected area in Tete Province, Mozambique.
The park was proclaimed in October 2013. Previously the area was an integral part of the Tchuma Tchato Community wildlife management program.

Location

References

National parks of Mozambique
Protected areas established in 2013
Geography of Tete Province
Tourist attractions in Tete Province